Noxiptiline (brand names Agedal, Elronon, Nogedal), also known as noxiptyline and dibenzoxine, is a tricyclic antidepressant (TCA) that was introduced in Europe in the 1970s for the treatment of depression. It has imipramine-like effects, acting as a serotonin and norepinephrine reuptake inhibitor, among other properties. Of the TCAs, noxiptiline has been described as one of the most effective, rivaling amitriptyline in clinical efficacy.

Synthesis
Ths synthesis is similar to that for Demexiptiline.

The condensation of dibenzosuberone (1) with hydroxylamine (2) gives the corresponding oxime [1785-74-6] (3). This is then reacted with 2-(dimethylamine)ethyl chloride [4584-46-7] (4).

References

Dibenzocycloheptenes
Dimethylamino compounds
Ketoximes
Tricyclic antidepressants